The 2012–13 season was Chelsea Football Club's 99th competitive season, 24th consecutive season in the top flight of English football, 21st consecutive season in the Premier League, and 107th year in existence as a football club. Chelsea's victory in the 2011–12 UEFA Champions League for the first time in their history qualified them for the season's UEFA Super Cup and FIFA Club World Cup, although through finishing third in their Champions League group Chelsea competed in the UEFA Europa League for the first time since the 2002–03 season – then known as the UEFA Cup.

On 13 June 2012, Roberto Di Matteo signed a two-year contract, becoming Chelsea's permanent manager, having been appointed as interim manager after the sacking of André Villas-Boas during the 2011–12 season. However, on 21 November 2012, Di Matteo was sacked after a 3–0 loss away to Juventus in the UEFA Champions League, with Rafael Benítez replacing him as interim manager until the end of the season. On 15 May 2013, Chelsea won their first and only silverware of the season, winning the Europa League final against Portuguese side Benfica. They finished the Premier League season in third place.

The season was the first since 2003–04 without Didier Drogba and the first since 2006–07 without Nicolas Anelka, both of whom joined Shanghai Shenhua.

Kits
Supplier: Adidas / Sponsor: Samsung

Month by month review

June

Excluding players such as Marko Marin, who was signed during the previous season, Chelsea made their first signing of the new campaign on 4 June, signing Belgian international winger Eden Hazard from Lille for an undisclosed fee rumoured to be £32 million. Three days later, the club lost a bid to purchase nearby Battersea Power Station which they considered converting to a stadium and make it their new home ground.

Roberto Di Matteo, who had won the Champions League in the previous season as interim manager, was given a two-year contract as first-team manager on 13 June. On 20 June, Didier Drogba, who scored more than 150 goals for Chelsea in his eight seasons, completed his free transfer to Chinese club Shanghai Shenhua.

July
At the Westminster Magistrates' Court, John Terry was found not guilty of racially abusing Anton Ferdinand. The district judge concluded "there being a doubt, the only verdict the court can record is one of not guilty." Chelsea announced a "global energy partnership" with Russian energy firm Gazprom in a three-year deal with a value deemed "commercially confidential", which will help reduce the club's deficits under UEFA Financial Fair Play Regulations. On 28 July, the club completed the signing of Brazilian midfielder Oscar from Internacional for a reported £25 million fee.

August
On 2 August, Kevin De Bruyne was sent on a season-long loan deal to Werder Bremen of the German Bundesliga. Chelsea played their first competitive match of the season in the Community Shield at Villa Park on 12 August, but lost 3–2 to Manchester City and had Branislav Ivanović sent off. The club officially announced the signings of Spanish right-back César Azpilicueta from Marseille and forward Victor Moses from Wigan Athletic on 24 August.

Chelsea's Premier League campaign began on 19 August with a 0–2 victory in an away match against Wigan Athletic. Both goals came within in the first ten minutes, the first from Branislav Ivanović and then a Frank Lampard penalty after Eden Hazard was fouled. The Blues won their second match 4–2 against Reading, and made it three wins out of three with a 2–0 win over Newcastle United. Chelsea lost 4–1 to Atlético Madrid in the 2012 UEFA Super Cup, for whom Radamel Falcao scored a hat-trick.

On transfer deadline day, Michael Essien left on a season-long loan deal with Real Madrid, signed by José Mourinho, who had previously signed him for Chelsea. Two more players left Chelsea on season-long loans the same day, as Yossi Benayoun went to West Ham United and Gaël Kakuta joined Dutch club Vitesse Arnhem.

September
On 3 September Chelsea sold Portuguese midfielder Raul Meireles to Turkish club Fenerbahçe for £8 million, due to Turkey's transfer window closing later than England's. Ryan Bertrand signed a five-year contract to extend his career at Chelsea until the summer of 2017. Chelsea's run of three consecutive league wins from the start of the season ended on 15 September as they drew 0–0 away to Queens Park Rangers. Before the game, Anton Ferdinand refused to shake John Terry's and Ashley Cole's hand in the pre-match handshake.

Chelsea began their defence of the UEFA Champions League on 19 September, at home to Juventus, and went 2–0 up with Oscar's first goals for the club before Juventus equalised. Brazilian defender David Luiz signed a new five-year contract at the club. On 22 September, Ashley Cole was the unlikely hero as Chelsea scored a dramatic late winner to defeat Stoke City at home. Chelsea beat Wolverhampton Wanderers 6–0 in the League Cup, with goals coming from Gary Cahill, Juan Mata, Fernando Torres and first goals for Victor Moses, Oriol Romeu and Ryan Bertrand.

Chelsea captain John Terry was banned for four games and fined £220,000 by the FA for racially abusing QPR defender Anton Ferdinand. On 29 September, Chelsea became the first team of the season to defeat Arsenal at the Emirates Stadium, with a 1–2 victory which put the Blues three points clear at the top after six matches.

October
Chelsea won for the first time in their 2012–13 Champions League campaign by defeating Danish champions Nordsjælland 0–4 away with goals from Ramires, David Luiz and two from playmaker Juan Mata. On 6 October, Fernando Torres, Frank Lampard, Eden Hazard and Branislav Ivanović scored in Chelsea's 4–1 home victory over Norwich City, before travelling to London rivals Tottenham Hotspur on 20 October for a 2–4 victory, with goals from Gary Cahill, Daniel Sturridge and two from Juan Mata. This was Chelsea's first victory at Tottenham's White Hart Lane since the FA Cup Quarter-Final Replay in 2007.

On 23 October, Chelsea lost their first Champions League match for the season as they lost 2–1 to Shakhtar Donetsk in Ukraine. Both Branislav Ivanović and Fernando Torres were sent off in Chelsea's home Premier League match against Manchester United on 28 October, a game which saw Chelsea go 0–2 down and equalise before a controversially late winner from United's Javier Hernández. Later, Chelsea Lodged an official complaint based on Mikel John Obi claiming the referee Mark Clattenburg had used "inappropriate language." Clattenburg was cleared of the accusations on 22 November. On 31 October, Chelsea defeated Manchester United 5–4 in the fourth round of the League Cup, coming from behind three times to force extra time before goals from Daniel Sturridge and Ramires secured the win for the Blues.

November

Chelsea playmaker Juan Mata was voted Premier League Player of the Month for October after scoring three goals and contributing three assists. On 3 November, Chelsea fell from first place in the Premier League (held since 25 August) after a 1–1 draw at Swansea City's Liberty Stadium. Chelsea kept up hope of qualifying from their Champions League group by defeating Shakhtar Donetsk 3–2 at home with an injury-time winner from Victor Moses on 7 November. The victory put Chelsea on top of Group E with two games to play. Chelsea then failed to win for their fourth Premier League match in a row after West Bromwich Albion beat them 2–1 away at The Hawthorns on 17 November. The defeat widened the gap between Chelsea and first-place by four points.

Roberto Di Matteo was dismissed from his position on 21 November, the morning after a 3–0 away defeat to Juventus, which put Chelsea at risk of being eliminated from the Champions League, ending a 262-day tenure which saw him win the 2011–12 UEFA Champions League and the 2011–12 FA Cup for Chelsea. On the same day, former Liverpool manager Rafael Benítez was appointed as the club's interim manager until the end of the season. His first act of his tenure was to name Dutchman Boudewijn Zenden, a former Chelsea midfielder who had played under him at Liverpool, as his assistant.

Chelsea midfielder Mikel John Obi was charged with misconduct by the FA after his allegations of racial abuse against referee Mark Clattenburg in the October fixture against Manchester United were found to be baseless. Mikel later received a three-match ban and a £60,000 fine as punishment for his behaviour after the match against Manchester United in October. Benítez's first game in charge was a goalless draw with 2011–12 Premier League winners Manchester City on 25 November. Despite not scoring, Chelsea kept their first clean sheet since the 1–0 win over Stoke City on 22 September. The club's next game, a West London Derby against Fulham, again ended 0–0, leaving Chelsea seven points off the top and six off second place.

December
On 1 December, Benítez lost for the first time in his Chelsea tenure after Chelsea were beaten 3–1 away to London rivals West Ham United. Three days later, Chelsea confirmed the signing of Brazil under-20 right back Wallace from Rio de Janeiro-based club Fluminense for an undisclosed fee. The option to sign a player from Fluminense was part of the deal that saw former Chelsea midfielder Deco join the team in 2010. On 5 December, it was announced that Mikel John Obi had agreed to extended his Chelsea contract until summer 2017.

On 5 December, Chelsea beat Nordsjælland 6–1 to record their biggest-ever Champions League win and Rafael Benítez's first win as manager, but due to other results, they were eliminated after finishing in third place, becoming the first reigning champions to exit the tournament at the group stage. On 8 December, Chelsea beat Sunderland 1–3 away with Fernando Torres scoring a brace. The victory was Chelsea's first league win in eight matches.

Chelsea entered the 2012 FIFA Club World Cup at the semi-final stage, where they beat CONCACAF champions Monterrey of Mexico 3–1 on 13 December, before losing 1–0 in the final to Corinthians of Brazil in the Yokohama Stadium three days later. Gary Cahill was sent off in injury time for violent conduct towards Corinthians' Emerson.

The club returned to England with a 5–1 home victory in the League Cup against Leeds United on 19 December, coming from a goal down at half-time to reach the semi-finals of the tournament. The club's first Premier League match since the Club World Cup was an 8–0 victory over Aston Villa on 23 December, followed by a 0–1 win at Norwich City's Carrow Road three days later. A third consecutive Premier League victory was confirmed in the last match of 2012, which saw Frank Lampard score twice as Chelsea came from behind to win 1–2 away to Everton on 30 December, ending the Liverpool-based club's unbeaten home season.

January

Chelsea made their first purchase of the January transfer window on 2 January by triggering the release clause in the contract of Newcastle United's Senegalese forward Demba Ba. Ba, who had scored 13 times in the season for his former club, was signed for £7 million. On the same day, Chelsea sold striker Daniel Sturridge to Liverpool for an undisclosed fee reported to be £12 million. Sturridge played 96 games for Chelsea in three-and-a-half seasons, scoring 24 goals.

The year opened with a 0–1 home defeat to bottom-of-the-table West London rivals QPR, with the goal coming from former Chelsea winger Shaun Wright-Phillips. However, Chelsea made progress in the third round of the FA Cup, where they beat Southampton 1–5 away at St Mary's on 5 January. Ba scored twice on his debut, while Frank Lampard scored his 193rd goal, moving him equal to Kerry Dixon as Chelsea's second-highest goalscorer of all time.

On 9 January, two defensive mistakes from defender Branislav Ivanović caused a 0–2 home loss in the League Cup first semi-final leg tie against Swansea City. In their next Premier League match, on 12 January, Chelsea ended Stoke City's 17-game unbeaten home run by winning 0–4 away. Lampard's converted penalty, his 194th goal, moved him above Dixon's total. However, the following home match against Southampton on 16 January saw Chelsea give away a 2–0 half-time lead, opened by Ba's first Premier League goal, to draw 2–2. The Blues then defeated London rivals Arsenal 2–1 on 20 January, with early goals from Juan Mata and Frank Lampard cutting Chelsea's deficit behind second-place Manchester City to six points.

On 23 January, Chelsea drew the second leg of their League Cup semi-final against Swansea City, which sent Swansea through to the final. Chelsea's Eden Hazard was given a straight red card for an alleged violent attack on a Swansea ballboy.

In the Fourth Round of the FA Cup, on 27 January, Chelsea went behind twice before a late Fernando Torres equaliser forced a replay against fellow West London club Brentford of League One. Chelsea's final Premier League game of the month, played on 30 January, saw them draw 2–2 for a second time in a week, conceding a 0–2 lead in the final three minutes away to Reading. Despite drawing, Frank Lampard's goal in the game made him the first midfielder in Premier League history to score ten or more goals in ten consecutive seasons.

February
On 2 February, Chelsea lost their first away game since 1 December, losing 3–2 to Newcastle United, for whom Moussa Sissoko scored a late winner. On 6 February, Ashley Cole became the first Chelsea player to earn 100 England caps when he played in a friendly against Brazil at Wembley. On 9 February, Chelsea defeated Wigan Athletic 4–1 to go within four points of second-placed Manchester City, with Marko Marin scoring for the first time. His goal was the club's 100th of the season in all competitions

Chelsea won their first Europa League match since the 2002–03 season on 14 February, beating Sparta Prague 0–1 at the Generali Arena through a late Oscar goal. Three days later, Chelsea triumphed in their FA Cup replay match against Brentford, reaching the fifth round of the FA Cup. In the second leg against Sparta Prague on 21 February, an injury time equaliser from Eden Hazard prevented the game from going to extra time by putting the club through 2–1 on aggregate.

On 24 February, Chelsea lost away to Manchester City, with Frank Lampard missing a second half penalty as the club lost 2–0. In their last game of the month, on 27 February, Chelsea won away in their FA Cup 5th round tie against Middlesbrough with second-half goals from Ramires and Victor Moses.

March
Chelsea began the month with a 1–0 home win over West Bromwich Albion on 2 March, with Demba Ba scoring the only goal of the match. On 7 March 2013, Chelsea lost the first leg of their last 16 Europa League tie away against Steaua București, with Ryan Bertrand conceding a penalty which was converted as the only goal of the match. In the 6th round of the FA Cup against Manchester United at Old Trafford, Chelsea conceded two early goals before a second half comeback with goals by Ramires and Eden Hazard earned a home replay. Chelsea managed to overturn their Europa League deficit with a 3–1 victory to advance 3–2 on aggregate, in a match in which Fernando Torres scored the winning goal.

April
April began with the FA Cup replay to Manchester United, winning it 1–0 thanks to a spectacular second half Demba Ba goal. Three days later, the club won their first leg Europa League tie against Russian side Rubin Kazan 3–1 with two goals from Fernando Torres and one from Victor Moses. With their third game in only seven days, Chelsea played Sunderland in the Premier League and came back down from 0–1 to win 2–1, the winner scored by Branislav Ivanović. Chelsea then played the second leg against Rubin Kazan on 11 April, losing 3–2 on the night but winning 5–4 on aggregate, sending them into the semi-finals of the competition. On 14 April, Chelsea met Manchester City in the FA cup semi-finals, where they lost 1–2 and were thus eliminated.

May
On 11 May, Frank Lampard broke Chelsea's all-time goal-scoring record by scoring two against Aston Villa, earning him his 203rd goal for Chelsea. On 15 May, Chelsea won the Europa League final 1–2 against Benfica. The day after Chelsea won the Europa League, Lampard signed a one-year contract extension with Chelsea. On 19 May, Chelsea ended the season with a 2–1 home-win against Everton, finishing in third place and qualifying for the 2013–14 Champions League.

Chelsea then went to an post-season trip to the United States, where they would meet Manchester City in two friendly matches. Chelsea's first match ended in disappointment as they let slip a three-goal lead at Busch Stadium in St. Louis, Missouri. Rafael Benítez's last game in charge for the Blues ended in a 3–5 defeat to Manchester City at Yankee Stadium in New York City on 25 May. It was also the last game for Paulo Ferreira, who retired after the match, as well as Yossi Benayoun's final match in a Chelsea shirt.

On 26 May, Chelsea announced that they had agreed to play in the inaugural Guinness International Champions Cup in the U.S. – Chelsea will join Milan, Internazionale, Juventus, Real Madrid, Valencia, Everton and the LA Galaxy in the competition. On 28 May, Rafael Benítez was released from his contract with Chelsea to become the new manager of Italian side Napoli.

Club

Coaching staff

Other information

|-
||Chief Executive|| Ron Gourlay
|-

Squads

First team squad

Stats as of end of season

Premier League squad

 HG = Home Grown Player
 U21 = Under 21 Player
Source: 2012–13 Premier League squad

Under 21 squad

Source: 2012–13 Under 21 squad

UEFA Champions League squad

 B

 B = List B Player
 HG1 = Association-trained player
 HG2 = Club-trained player
Source: 2012–13 UEFA Champions League squad

UEFA Europa League squad

 B = List B Player
 HG1 = Association-trained player
 HG2 = Club-trained player
Source: 2012–13 UEFA Europa League squad

FIFA Club World Cup squad

HG = Association-trained player
HG = Club-trained player
Source: 2012 FIFA Club World Cup squad

Transfers

In

Summer

Winter

Out

Summer

Winter

Loan out

Overall transfer activity

Spending
Summer:  £74,050,000

Winter:  £12,100,000

Total:  £86,150,000

Income
Summer:  £8,000,000

Winter:  £12,000,000

Total:  £20,000,000

Totals
Summer:  £66,050,000

Winter:  £100,000

Total:  £66,150,000

Friendlies

Pre-season

Post-season

Competitions

Overall

Competition record

FA Community Shield

UEFA Super Cup

FIFA Club World Cup

Premier League

League table

Results summary

Results by round

Matches

FA Cup

League Cup

UEFA Champions League

Group stage

UEFA Europa League

Knockout phase

Round of 32

Round of 16

Quarter-finals

Semi-finals

Final

Statistics

Appearances
As of end of season

Goalscorers
As of end of season.

Clean sheets
As of end of season.

Disciplinary record
As of end of season.

Overview
As of end of season.

Awards

References

External links

2012-13
2012–13 Premier League by team
2012–13 UEFA Europa League participants seasons
2012–13 UEFA Champions League participants seasons
2012-13